Taylor Memorial Arboretum (30 acres) is an arboretum and garden located at 10 Ridley Drive, Wallingford, Pennsylvania, United States, along Ridley Creek. It is open daily. Since May 2016 it has been administrated by Widener University.

The arboretum includes a grotto (former quarry), millrace, and pond with bald cypress. Its collection includes three Pennsylvania State Champion Trees (a giant dogwood, a needle juniper, and a lacebark elm), as well as azaleas, dogwoods, magnolias, junipers, lilacs, viburnums, witch-hazels, Japanese maples, boxwoods, and arborvitae. The site also contains cattails, ferns, irises, mosses, rushes, and wildflowers.

The arboretum was established in 1931 by Joshua C. Taylor, a Chester lawyer and conservation proponent on the site of a previous industrial mill complex.  It is located seven miles south of the similarly named John J. Tyler Arboretum.

In 2005 the dam was removed to make the environment "flow more smoothly" and because people were swimming in the creek. The remains of the dam, such as large rocks and the steel that held it together, can be found at the bank of the creek.

See also
 List of botanical gardens in the United States

References

External links
 Official site

Arboreta in Pennsylvania
Botanical gardens in Pennsylvania
Parks in Delaware County, Pennsylvania